Nothing in Common is an American sitcom television series which aired on NBC from April 2 to June 3, 1987. Based on the 1986 film of the same name directed by Garry Marshall and starring Tom Hanks and Jackie Gleason, the series starred Todd Waring as David Basner and Bill Macy as David's father Max Basner. Seven episodes were broadcast immediately after the highly-rated series Cheers, but failed to retain the strong audience of that series and was cancelled after only seven episodes had aired.

Todd Waring later reprised another Hanks role in a 1988 television sequel to Splash for The Wonderful World of Disney titled Splash, Too.

Plot

Cast
Todd Waring as David Basner 
Bill Macy as Max Basner 
Mona Lyden as Norma Starr 
Bill Applebaum as Mark Glick
Wendy Kilbourne as Jacqueline North 
Elizabeth Bennett as Victoria Upton-Smythe
Patrick Richwood as Myron Nipper 
Billy Wirth as Joey D.

Episodes

External links

1987 American television series debuts
1987 American television series endings
1980s American sitcoms
English-language television shows
NBC original programming
Television shows set in Chicago
Live action television shows based on films
Television series by Sony Pictures Television